Maximiliano Achille Uggè (born 24 September 1991) is an Italian footballer who last played as a defender for FCI Levadia.

Career
Born in Treviglio, Lombardy, Uggè spent nearly a decade for Internazionale. He played for Inter from Pulcini team to Allievi Nazionali team in 2007–08 season. He won the national title with his age group in 2007–08 season and played a match for the first team during international break. For the 2008–09 season, Inter loaned him and several other youth players to Monza.

In the next season he left for Triestina's Primavera team, while Inter team-mate Luca Siligardi left for its first team. He also played the match against Inter Primavera that season, losing 0–6. On 2 February 2010, he was transferred to Monza again.

In the 2010–11 season, Uggè remained in Monza and was promoted to the first team, playing in both the league and the in the cup.

In the 2012–13 season he was transferred to AC Pavia, and was subsequently loaned to Lecco.

On 30 August 2019, he joined Gozzano.

On 30 July 2020 he signed a one-year contract with Gubbio.

On 22 June 2021, he returned to Estonia and signed with FCI Levadia.

Honours
Levadia Tallinn
Meistriliiga:2021
Estonian Supercup: 2022

Nõmme Kalju
Meistriliiga: 2018
Estonian Supercup: 2019

Champion
Campionato Nazionale Allievi: 2008 (Inter U17)
Campionato Giovanissimi Nazionali: 2006 (Inter U15)
Runner-up
Campionato Nazionale Dante Berretti: 2009 (Monza U20)

References

External links
 Football.it Profile 
 
 Monza Profile 

1991 births
Living people
People from Treviglio
Italian footballers
Inter Milan players
A.C. Monza players
U.S. Triestina Calcio 1918 players
Meistriliiga players
Nõmme Kalju FC players
A.C. Gozzano players
A.S. Gubbio 1910 players
FCI Levadia Tallinn players
Serie C players
Italian expatriate footballers
Expatriate footballers in Estonia
Association football defenders
Italian expatriate sportspeople in Estonia
Sportspeople from the Province of Bergamo
Footballers from Lombardy